Paulo Marcos de Jesus Ribeiro (born 25 February 1986), commonly known as Paulão, is a Brazilian footballer who plays as a central defender.

Club career

Early career
In January 2008, Paulão was signed by Itapirense in 2-year contract. He was infamously cautioned 8 times and suspended twice in the Campeonato Paulista Série A3. In June 2008 he was signed by Universal Futebol Clube and immediately loaned to ASA for the 2008 Campeonato Brasileiro Série C. Paulão remained in ASA in 2009 season, winning the Campeonato Alagoano. His team also finished as the runner-up of 2009 Campeonato Brasileiro Série C in 2009.

Grêmio Prudente
On 21 September 2009 he was loaned to Grêmio Barueri during the 2009 Campeonato Brasileiro Série A. He made his Campeonato Brasileiro Série A debut on 6 December 2009.

In January 2010, Barueri relocated to Presidente Prudente and bought Paulão from Universal. He became a regular starter of the team, made 16 starts in the 2010 Campeonato Paulista, finished as the semi-finalists. He also played 6 times in the 2010 Campeonato Brasileiro Série A, and was sent off in the opening game. He extended his contract in June.

Grêmio
On 29 August 2010 he left for fellow top division team Grêmio de Porto Alegre in one-year loan. Paulão made his club debut on 11 September 2010, winning Corinthians 1–0. Since then he made 13 starts for Grêmio, made a total of 20 appearances in 2010 Campeonato Brasileiro Série A for Grêmio and Grêmio Prudente. In 2011 season, Paulão played 6 out of possible 10 games of 2011 Campeonato Gaúcho, reached semi-final of the first stage, the Piratini Cup. He left the club before the final. He was the starting centre-back in the 2011 Copa Libertadores.

Guangzhou Evergrande
On 2 March 2011, Chinese Super League club Guangzhou Evergrande announced that they had signed Paulão on a four-year deal with a fee of US$3.5 million. It was reported that Grêmio Prudente and Grêmio would divided the transfer fee in fifty-fifty. Paulão made his CSL debut for Guangzhou against Dalian Shide on 2 April 2011. He made 28 appearances in the 2011 league season as Guangzhou Evergrande successfully achieved Super League champion for the first time in the club's history.

Return to Brazil
On 6 January 2013, Paulão was loaned to Cruzeiro for one year. On 2 January 2014, Internacional announced that they would sign Paulão on a three-year contract. In May 2017, he signed a loan deal with Vasco da Gama. In August 2018 he signed a loan deal until December 2019 with América Mineiro.

Career statistics

Honours
ASA
Campeonato Alagoano: 2009

Guangzhou Evergrande
Chinese Super League: 2011, 2012 
Chinese FA Cup: 2012 
Chinese FA Super Cup: 2012

Cruzeiro
Campeonato Brasileiro Série A: 2013

Internacional
Campeonato Gaúcho: 2014, 2015, 2016

Fortaleza
Campeonato Cearense: 2020

Cuiabá
Campeonato Mato-Grossense: 2021, 2022

References

External links
 
 Futpedia (Profile 2) 
 Grêmio Profile 

1986 births
Living people
Sportspeople from Salvador, Bahia
People from Salvador, Bahia
Brazilian footballers
Association football central defenders
Campeonato Brasileiro Série A players
Campeonato Brasileiro Série B players
Campeonato Brasileiro Série C players
Chinese Super League players
Agremiação Sportiva Arapiraquense players
Grêmio Barueri Futebol players
Grêmio Foot-Ball Porto Alegrense players
Cruzeiro Esporte Clube players
Sport Club Internacional players
CR Vasco da Gama players
América Futebol Clube (MG) players
Fortaleza Esporte Clube players
Cuiabá Esporte Clube players
Guangzhou F.C. players
Brazilian expatriate footballers
Brazilian expatriate sportspeople in China
Expatriate footballers in China